The 1906 Rollins Tars football team represented Rollins College in the sport of American football as an independent during the 1906 college football season.

Schedule

References

Rollins
Rollins Tars football seasons
Rollins Tars football